Camponotus anthrax is a species of ant in the subgenus Camponotus (Myrmentoma). It is endemic to western North America.

References

anthrax
Insects described in 1911
Articles created by Qbugbot